Carl Ruck (born 23 December 1912, died 1980) was a German field hockey player who competed in the 1936 Summer Olympics.

He was a member of the German field hockey team, which won the silver medal. He played one match as forward.

External links
 
profile

1912 births
Field hockey players at the 1936 Summer Olympics
German male field hockey players
Olympic field hockey players of Germany
Olympic silver medalists for Germany
1980 deaths
Olympic medalists in field hockey
Medalists at the 1936 Summer Olympics
20th-century German people